BAP Coronel Bolognesi (CL-82) was a  light cruiser in service with the Peruvian Navy. Renamed BAP Coronel Bolognesi (CL-82), in honor of the Peruvian Colonel Francisco Bolognesi, it arrived to its new homeport of Callao on 19 March 1960.

In service, the ship has participated in several exercises, including the multinational UNITAS manoeuvres, as well as taking part in disaster relief operations after the 1970 Ancash earthquake. In 1963, after the creation of the Servicio de Aviación Naval (Naval Aviation Service), the Coronel Bolognesi started operating Bell 47G helicopters from its fantail. It was passed to a reserve status on June 9, 1981, renamed Pontón Perú (UAI-113) on 30 May 1982 and decommissioned on 20 September of the same year.

Sources
Rodríguez Asti, John, Cruceros. Buques de la Marina de Guerra del Perú desde 1884. Dirección de Intereses Marítimos, 2000.

Crown Colony-class cruisers of the Peruvian Navy
Ships built on the River Clyde
1942 ships